Soltani (soltānī, ; ; also spelt as Sultani; derived from sultan) is an Arabic and Persian name meaning ‘strength-ruler’ and may refer to:
 Neda Agha-Soltan, often incorrectly called "Neda Soltani", see Death of Neda Agha-Soltan
 Neda Soltani, an Iranian woman who had to flee Iran after media reports confused her with Neda Agha-Soltan
 Hocine Soltani, a boxer from Algeria
 Karim Soltani, an Algerian footballer
 Abdolfattah Soltani, an Iranian human rights lawyer
 Soltani, Chaharmahal and Bakhtiari, a village in Chaharmahal and Bakhtiari Province, Iran
 Soltani, Baft, a village in Kerman Province, Iran
Soltani Chelow Kabob, a popular Persian food dish
 Soltani, Sistan and Baluchestan, a village in Sistan and Baluchestan Province, Iran
 Soltani, West Azerbaijan, a village in West Azerbaijan Province, Iran
 Soltani Olya, a village in South Khorasan Province, Iran

Persian-language surnames
Arabic-language surnames
Iranian-language surnames